Players in bold are currently playing in K League 2.
 Nationality is listed under the official K League player registration; players may acquire multiple citizenship.
 If players have been capped for a national team, this nationality takes precedence over the nationality stated in the official K League player registration database.
 In dual citizen annotation, if dual citizen players have an international career, the country listed in italics is the national team they have played for.

Africa (CAF)

Cameroon 
 Nyom Nyom Aloys (2015 Goyang Hi FC)

Cote d'Ivoire
 Aubin Kouakou (2016 Chungju Hummel, 2017 FC Anyang)

Liberia
 Seku Conneh (2018 Ansan Greeners)

Niger
 Olivier Bonnes (2018 Gwangju FC, 2018 Seongnam FC); also played in K League 1 ※ Dual citizen of Niger and France

Nigeria
 Chisom Egbuchulam (2019 Suwon FC)
 Samuel Nnamani (2021 Jeonnam Dragons, 2022 Bucheon FC 1995)

South Africa 
 Lars Veldwijk (2020 Suwon FC); also played in K League 1 ※ Dual citizen of South Africa and the Netherlands

Togo 
 Vincent Bossou (2015 Goyang Hi FC)

Tunisia 
 Imed Louati (2015 Gyeongnam FC)

Asia (AFC)

Australia
 Aleksandar Jovanovic (2013 Suwon FC); also played in K League 1
 Adrian Leijer (2017–2018 Suwon FC); also played in K League 1
 Bruce Djite (2017 Suwon FC); also played in K League 1
 Dario Vidošić (2017 Seongnam FC)
 Nick Ansell (2019 Jeonnam Dragons, 2020 Gyeongnam FC)
 Aleksandar Šušnjar (2019 Busan IPark)
 Dylan Fox (2019 FC Anyang)
 Connor Chapman (2020 Daejeon Hana Citizen); also played in K League 1
 Ryan Edwards (2021–2022 Busan IPark) ※ Dual citizen of Australia and Scotland
 Aaron Calver (2022 Gwangju FC); also played in K League 1
 Patrick Flottmann (2023–present Seongnam FC)
 Peter Makrillos (2023–present Chungbuk Cheongju)

China
 Nan Song (2016–2018 Bucheon FC 1995)

East Timor
 Diogo Santos Rangel (2014 Daejeon Citizen, 2014 Gangwon FC) ※ Dual citizen of East Timor and Brazil
 Pedro Henrique Oliveira (2017 Daejeon Citizen) ※ Dual citizen of East Timor and Brazil

Indonesia
 Asnawi Mangkualam (2021–2022 Ansan Greeners, 2023–present Jeonnam Dragons)

Japan
 Robert Cullen (2015 Seoul E-Land)
 Daigo Watanabe (2016 Busan IPark)
 Michihiro Yasuda (2017 Busan IPark)
 Atsuki Wada (2017 Seoul E-Land)
 Tomoki Wada (2017 Seoul E-Land); also played in K League 1
 Minori Sato (2018 Gwangju FC)
 Chikashi Masuda (2019 Seoul E-Land); also played in K League 1
 Masatoshi Ishida (2019 Ansan Greeners, 2020 Suwon FC, 2021–2022 Daejeon Hana Citizen); also played in K League 1
 Go Iwase (2021–2022 Ansan Greeners)
 Ryohei Michibuchi (2021 Chungnam Asan)
 Yuki Kobayashi (2021 Seoul E-Land); also played in K League 1
 Mitsuru Maruoka (2022 Gimpo FC)
 Tsubasa Nishi (2022–present Seoul E-Land); also played in K League 1
 Ryonosuke Ohori (2022 Gyeongnam FC)
 Yuhei Sato (2022–present Jeonnam Dragons)
 Kazuki Takahashi (2023–present Bucheon FC 1995)

Korea DPR
 An Byong-jun (2019–2020 Suwon FC, 2021–2022 Busan IPark); also played in K League 1

Lebanon
 Soony Saad (2020 Ansan Greeners)

Malaysia
 Kogileswaran Raj (2023–present Chungbuk Cheongju)

Palestine
 Éder (2015–2016 Daegu FC); also played in K League 1 ※ Dual citizen of Palestine and Brazil

Philippines 
 Álvaro Silva (2016 Daejeon Citizen); also played in K League 1 ※ Dual citizen of Philippines and Spain

Syria
 Serginho (2015 Daegu FC, 2016 Gangwon FC) ※ Dual citizen of Syria and Brazil 
 Jonatas Belusso (2015 Gangwon FC, 2016 Seoul E-Land) ※ Dual citizen of Syria and Brazil

Uzbekistan
 Bahodir Nasimov (2017 Ansan Greeners)
 Bahodir Pardaev (2017 Bucheon FC 1995)
 Shohrux Gadoyev (2018–2019 Daejeon Citizen)
 Sanzhar Tursunov (2018–2019 Daejeon Citizen)
 Jovlon Ibrokhimov (2019 Suwon FC)
 Rustam Ashurmatov (2019 Gwangju FC); also played in K League 1
 Khursid Giyosov (2020 FC Anyang) 
 Oleg Zoteev (2020–2021 Jeonnam Dragons)
 Ikromjon Alibaev (2021 Daejeon Hana Citizen); also played in K League 1

Vietnam
 Nguyễn Văn Toàn (2023–present Seoul E-Land)
 Nguyễn Cảnh Anh (2023–present Cheonan City)
 Vũ Minh Hiếu (2023–present Cheonan City)

Europe (UEFA)

Austria
 Felipe Dorta (2019 Ansan Greeners)
 Armin Mujakic (2020 Chungnam Asan)

Bosnia and Herzegovina
 Haris Harba (2017 Bucheon FC 1995)
 Luka Juričić (2022–present Gimpo FC)

Croatia 
 Ivan Herceg (2016–2017 Gyeongnam FC, 2018 Seoul E-Land); also played in K League 1
 Marin Oršulić (2017–2018 Seongnam FC)
 Domagoj Drožđek (2021–2022 Busan IPark)
 Damir Šovšić (2023–present Cheonan City); also played in K League 1 ※ Dual citizen of Croatia and Bosnia and Herzegovina

Cyprus
 Valentinos Sielis (2020 Jeju United, 2021–2022 Busan IPark); also played in K League 1

Estonia 
 Henri Anier (2019 Suwon FC)

Georgia
 Levan Shengelia (2017 Daejeon Citizen)
 Nika Kacharava (2022–present Jeonnam Dragons)

Germany
 Richard Sukuta-Pasu (2020 Seoul E-Land) ※ Dual citizen of Germany and DR Congo

Hungary
 Soma Novothny (2019 Busan IPark)

Italy
 Boadu Maxwell Acosty (2020–2022 FC Anyang) ※ Dual citizen of Italy and Ghana; also played in K League 1

Kosovo
 Leonard Pllana (2022–present Jeonnam Dragons) ※ Dual citizen of Kosovo and Sweden

Montenegro
 Bogdan Milić (2013 Suwon FC); also played in K League 1
 Vladan Adžić (2014–2015 & 2017 Suwon FC); also played in K League 1
 Luka Rotković (2017 Ansan Greeners)

Netherlands
 Arsenio Valpoort (2018 Busan IPark)
 Sherjill MacDonald (2018 Busan IPark)
 Luc Castaignos (2020 Gyeongnam FC); also played in K League 1

Norway
 Julian Kristoffersen (2020 Jeonnam Dragons)

Portugal
 Renato Santos (2021 Busan IPark)

Romania
 Ciprian Vasilache (2014 Gangwon FC, 2014 Chungju Hummel)
 Cristian Dănălache (2016 Gyeongnam FC, 2017 Daejeon Citizen)
 Jean-Claude Bozga (2016 Daejeon Citizen) ※ Dual citizen of Romania and DR Congo
 Aurelian Chițu (2018–2019 Daejeon Citizen)

Serbia 
 Miloš Stojanović (2015 Gyeongnam FC, 2016 Busan IPark); also played in K League 1
 Ivan Marković (2016 Gyeongnam FC)
 Uroš Đerić (2020 Gyeongnam FC); also played in K League 1
 Lazar Arsić (2020 Seoul E-Land)

Slovakia 
 Filip Hlohovský (2017 Seongnam FC, 2018 Daejeon Citizen)
 Ákos Szarka (2020 Suwon FC)

Spain 
 Sisi (2015 Suwon FC)
 Jaime Gavilán (2017 Suwon FC); also played in K League 1
 Ismael Jorge Balea (2020 Ansan Greeners) ※ Dual citizen of Spain and Uruguay

Sweden 
 Philip Hellquist (2020 Chungnam Asan)
 Robin Simović (2023–present Jeonnam Dragons)

North America, Central America, and Caribbean (CONCACAF)

Costa Rica 
 Elias Aguilar (2020 Jeju United); also played in K League 1
Jonathan Moya (2021–present FC Anyang)

Jamaica 
 Ryan Johnson (2015 Seoul E-Land)

Mexico 
 Édgar Pacheco (2016 Gangwon FC)

Panama 
 Jorman Aguilar (2022 Bucheon FC 1995)

Trinidad and Tobago 
 Carlyle Mitchell (2015–2016 Seoul E-Land)

United States 
 Austin Berry (2015 FC Anyang)
 Seth Moses (2015 FC Anyang)

South America (CONMEBOL)

Argentina
 Jonathan Castillo (2016 Chungju Hummel)
 Nicolas Orsini (2016 FC Anyang)
 Diego Bielkiewicz (2018 Seoul E-Land)
 Santiago De Sagastizabal (2021 Ansan Greeners)
 Mauricio Asenjo (2022 Seoul E-Land)
 Felipe Cadenazzi (2022 Seoul E-Land)

Brazil
 Cássio Vargas (2013 Gwangju FC)
 Lúcio (2013 Gwangju FC); also played in K League 1
 Tutinha (2013 Chungju Hummel)
 Miguel Bianconi (2013 Chungju Hummel)
 Alex (2013–2014 Goyang Hi FC, 2014 Gangwon FC, 2016 Daegu FC, 2017 FC Anyang, 2017 Seoul E-Land, 2018 FC Anyang, 2019 Seoul E-Land) 
 Almir (2013 Goyang Hi FC, 2014 Gangwon FC, 2015 Bucheon FC 1995); also played in K League 1
 Luizinho (2013 Gwangju FC)
 Alessandro Lopes (2013 Chungju Hummel); also played in K League 1
 Joelson Franca Dias (2014 Gangwon FC)
 Rodrigo (2014–2015, 2017 Bucheon FC 1995)
 Romarinho (2014 Gwangju FC)
 Fabio Neves (2014 Gwangju FC); also played in K League 1
 Roniere (2014 Goyang Hi FC)
 Wagner (2014 FC Anyang); also played in K League 1
 Felipe Adão (2014 FC Anyang)
 Adriano (2014 Daejeon Citizen); also played in K League 1
 Malcon (2016 Chungju Hummel)
 Matheus (2014 Daegu FC); also played in K League 1
 Vanderlei (2014 Daejeon Citizen)
 Johnathan (2014–2015 Daegu FC); also played in K League 1
 Neverton (2014 Daegu FC)
 Maranhão (2014 Daejeon Citizen)
 Diego (2014 Gwangju FC)
 Maycon (2014 Goyang Hi FC)
 Japa (2014–2015 Suwon FC)
 Kalel (2014 Chungju Hummel)
 Raphael (2014 Chungju Hummel)
 Léo Jaime (2015 Daegu FC)
 Henan (2015 Gangwon FC); also played in K League 1
 Gil  (2015–2016 Gangwon FC)
 Tarabai (2015–2016 Seoul E-Land)
 Marcinho (2015–2016 Chungju Hummel)
 Fauver (2015 Gyeongnam FC)
 Lukian (2015–2016 Bucheon FC 1995, 2017 Busan IPark, 2017 FC Anyang)
 Waguininho (2016–2017 Bucheon FC 1995); also played in K League 1
 Paulo Sérgio Luiz de Souza (2016 Daegu FC, 2017 Seongnam FC)
 César Fernando Silva Melo (2016 Daegu FC); also played in K League 1
 Wanderson Carvalho (2016 Daejeon Citizen); also played in K League 1
 Willian Popp (2016 Busan IPark, 2018 Bucheon FC 1995)
 Cesinha (2016 Daegu FC); also played in K League 1
 Matheus Alves (2016 Gangwon FC, 2018 Suwon FC, 2021 Chungnam Asan)
 Rafael Ratão (2016 Chungju Hummel)
 Nilson (2016 Busan IPark, 2017–2019 Bucheon FC 1995, 2020–2021 FC Anyang, 2022–present Bucheon FC 1995); also played in K League 1
 William Henrique (2017 Ansan Greeners)
 Josiel Alves de Oliveira (2017 FC Anyang)
 Danilo Neco (2017 Seongnam FC); also played in K League 1
 Danny Morais (2017 Busan IPark)
 Rômulo (2017–2019 Busan IPark); also played in K League 1
 Alex Bruno (2017 Gyeongnam FC, 2018 Suwon FC)
 Daniel Lovinho (2017 Seoul E-Land)
 Yago Moreira Silva (2017 Seoul E-Land)
 Marcão (2017 Gyeongnam FC); also played in K League 1
 Bruno Cantanhede (2017 Daejeon Citizen, 2018 FC Anyang)
 Dário Jr. (2017 Seongnam FC)
 Pedro Carmona (2017 Suwon FC)
 Léo Mineiro (2017 Busan IPark); also played in K League 1
 Éder (2018 Seongnam FC, 2020 Jeju United); also played in K League 1 ※ Dual citizen of Brazil and Palestine
 Alex (2018 Suwon FC, 2019 FC Anyang)
 Felipe (2018–2019 Gwangju FC); also played in K League 1
 Marcos Antônio (2018 FC Anyang)
 Jonathan Balotelli (2018 Busan IPark, 2021–present Jeonnam Dragons)
 Róbson (2018 Gwangju FC, 2019 Seoul E-Land, 2021–2022 Ansan Greeners, 2023–present Chungnam Asan)
 Douglas Coutinho (2019 Seoul E-Land)
 Wanderson (2019 Jeonnam Dragons); also played in K League 1
 Matheus Pato (2019 Daejeon Citizen)
 Willyan (2019 Gwangju FC, 2021–2022 Gyeongnam FC, 2022 Daejeon Hana Citizen); also played in K League 1
 Diego Maurício (2019 Busan IPark); also played in K League 1
 Gustavo Vintecinco (2019 Ansan Greeners); also played in K League 1
 Bruno Nunes (2019 Jeonnam Dragons)
 Ramazotti (2019 Daejeon Citizen)
 Bruno Baio (2019 Jeonnam Dragons, 2020–2021 Daejeon Hana Citizen)
 André Luis (2020 Daejeon Hana Citizen)
 Bruno (2020 Ansan Greeners, 2020 Chungnam Asan)
 Jefferson Baiano (2020 Bucheon FC 1995)
 Maurides (2020 FC Anyang)
 William Barbio (2020 Bucheon FC 1995, 2021 Seoul E-Land)
 Anderson Canhoto (2020–2022 Ansan Greeners)
 Danilo Alves (2020 Suwon FC)
 Edinho (2020–2021 Daejeon Hana Citizen)
 Felipe Augusto (2020 Ansan Greeners)
 Hernandes Rodrigues (2020 Jeonnam Dragons, 2021–2022 Gyeongnam FC); also played in K League 1
 Leandro Ribeiro (2020–2021 Seoul E-Land, 2022 Daejeon Hana Citizen); also played in K League 1
 Marlone (2020–present Suwon FC); also played in K League 1
 Negueba (2020 Gyeongnam FC); also played in K League 1
 Rodolfo (2020 Jeonnam Dragons)
 Alex Sandro (2021 Chungnam Asan)
 Tiago Orobó (2022 Gyeongnam FC); also played in K League 1
 Reis (2022 Gwangju FC); also played in K League 1
 Mike (2022 Gwangju FC)
 Sandro Lima (2022 Gwangju FC); also played in K League 1
 Guilherme Castro (2022–present Gyeongnam FC)
 Heliardo (2022 Gyeongnam FC)
 Andrigo (2022–present FC Anyang)
 Bruno Lamas (2022–present Busan IPark); also played in K League 1
 Thiago Henrique (2022–present Ansan Greeners)
 Renato Kayzer (2022 Daejeon Hana Citizen)
 Renan (2023–present Seoul E-Land)
 Ronan (2023–present Seoul E-Land)
 Fessin (2023–present Busan IPark)
 Bruno Oliveira (2023–present Seoul E-Land)
 Gabriel Ramos (2023–present Bucheon FC 1995)
 Leonardo Kalil (2023–present Bucheon FC 1995)
 Valdívia (2023–present Jeonnam Dragons)
 Gabriel (2023–present Ansan Greeners)
 Wandrew (2023–present Ansan Greeners)
 Gleyson (2023–present Gyeongnam FC)
 Juninho Rocha (2023–present Gimpo FC)
 Jorge Luiz (2023–present Chungbuk Cheongju)
 Paulinho (2023–present Chungbuk Cheongju)
 Rodolfo (2023–present Cheonan City)
 Bruno Mota (2023–present Cheonan City)

Chile
 Ignacio Herrera (2018 Seoul E-Land)

Colombia
 Manuel Palacios (2019 FC Anyang); also played in K League 1
 Luis Mina (2023–present Gimpo FC)

Ecuador
 Marlon de Jesús (2019 Bucheon FC 1995)

Uruguay
 Raúl Tarragona (2017–2018 Ansan Greeners)
 Pablo González (2023–present Gimpo FC)

Venezuela
 Daniel Febles (2018 Seoul E-Land)

See also
 List of foreign K League 1 players

Notes

External links
K League official website: Player Index
National Football Teams

 
Foreign Players
K League 2

Association football player non-biographical articles